Brierley Forest Park, Sutton in Ashfield was designated a Local Nature Reserve in 2006. It contains Calcareous grassland, sown grassland, wildflower meadows with hoary ragwort, yellow-wort, wild carrot and lesser trefoil. There are four wetland feature areas, Brierley Waters, a reed swamp, Rooley Brook and the visitor centre pond. There are species rich hedgerows, woodland and semi natural vegetation.

Description
The park has a visitor centre, fishing, football pitches, children's play areas, picnicking, cycling and horse paths, bird feeding stations, an arboretum, a remembrance grove and disabled car parking. A Parkrun takes place every Saturday morning.

References

Parks in England
Forest parks in England
Sutton-in-Ashfield
Nature reserves in Nottinghamshire
Parks and open spaces in Nottinghamshire